Jean-Christian Lang (born 22 August 1950 in Roubaix) is a French football manager and former player.

Lang began his playing career with FC Sochaux-Montbéliard, playing three Ligue 1 matches, before leaving to play in Ligue 2 with CS Louhans-Cuiseaux, LB Châteauroux, CS Thonon and FC Annecy.

Lang was a player-manager with Annecy, and went on to manage USF Le Puy and FC Montceau Bourgogne in Ligue 2, before moving to Swiss club FC Servette. He has also managed clubs in North Africa, including Difaa El Jadida and Maghreb Fez in Morocco, as well as JS Kabylie in Algeria.

Lang has Polish ancestry, and became a naturalised French citizen in 1964. He speaks fluent Polish, French and English.

References

1950 births
Living people
French footballers
FC Sochaux-Montbéliard players
LB Châteauroux players
Louhans-Cuiseaux FC players
French expatriate sportspeople in Algeria
French football managers
FC Annecy managers
Expatriate football managers in Algeria
FC Annecy players
Difaâ Hassani El Jadidi managers
JS Kabylie managers
Al-Wehda Club (Mecca) managers
Association football midfielders